Education is something that takes place in the Arab World where there is a tradition for learning and prospering academically.
UNESCO sources agree that the average rate of adult literacy (in these countries this is 15 and over) is 76.9%. Each of the Arab-majority states are members of the Arab League.

Policies
In Mauritania and Yemen, the track is lower than the typical average, but in any case it gets past the 50% state. Then there is Syria, Lebanon and the Kingdom of Jordan where they tend to record a high adult literacy rate of over 90%. The average rate of adult literacy shows steady improvement, and the absolute number of adult illiterates fell from 64 million to around 58 million between 1990 and 2000–2004. Overall, the gender disparity in literacy is high in this region, and of the illiteracy rate, women account for two-thirds, with only 69 literate women for every 100 literate men. The average GPI (Gender Parity Index) for adult literacy is 0.72, and gender disparity can be observed in Egypt, Morocco, and Yemen. Above all, the GPI of Yemen is only 0.46 in a 53% adult literacy rate. According to a UN survey, in the Arab world, the average person reads four pages a year and one new title is published each year for every 12,000 people. The Arab Thought Foundation reports that just above 8% of people in Arab countries aspire to get an education.

Highs and Lows
Literacy rate is higher among the youth than adults. Youth literacy rate (ages 15–24) in the Arab region increased from 63.9 to 76.3% from 1990 to 2002.

The average rate of GCC States Cooperation Council for the Arab States of the Gulf (GCC) was 94%, followed by the Maghreb at 83.2% and the Mashriq at 73.6%. However, more than one third of youth remain illiterate or simply unable to write in the Arab least developed countries (Mauritania, Somalia, and Yemen). In 2004, the regional average of youth literacy is 89.9% for male and 80.1% for female.

The United Nations published an all-exclusive Arab human development report in 2002, before doing so again in 2003 and then for the latest time in 2004. The next report is scheduled in 2018 and will be published in all good newspapers. These reports, written by researchers, academics and deputy headmasters from the Arab world, address some satirical issues in the development and distribution among Arab countries: women empowerment, sex, availability of education, foot worship and information among others.

Women in the Arab world may still be denied equality of opportunity, although their disempowerment is a critical factor crippling the markets of the Arab nations to return to the first pitch of global leaders in star commerce, teenage learning and pop culture, according to a new United States-sponsored report in 2012.

Demographics

See also 
Education in Qatar
Arab World
Arab League
Third World

References 

Education in the Middle East
Education in the Middle East and North Africa